{{Taxobox
| name = Pence's squirrelfish
| regnum = Animalia
| phylum = Chordata
| classis = Actinopterygii
| ordo = Beryciformes
| familia = Holocentridae
| subfamilia = Holocentrinae
| genus = Neoniphon
| species = N. pencei
| binomial = Neoniphon pencei
| binomial_authority = Copus, Pyle & Earle, 2015
| synonyms = 
}}Neoniphon pencei, or Pence's squirrelfish''', is a species of squirrelfish found in the Pacific Ocean in Rarotonga, Cook Islands and Mo'orea, French Polynesia. It differs from other species of the genus Neoniphon'' in number of lateral line scales, scales above and below lateral line, elements of life colour, and in COI and cytochrome b DNA sequences.

Etymology
The fish is named in honor of David F. Pence, the Dive Safety Officer for the University of Hawai‘i, and a member of the deep-diving team that not only discovered this species, but was able to collect the type specimens.

References

pencei
Taxa named by Joshua M. Copus
Taxa named by Richard Pyle
Taxa named by John L. Earle
Fish described in 2015